Ikeguchi (written: 池口) is a Japanese surname. Notable people with the surname include:

Ekan Ikeguchi (born 1936), Shingon Buddhist priest
 (born 1949), Japanese politician

See also
6910 Ikeguchi, main-belt asteroid

Japanese-language surnames